Sageview Capital is an American investment firm that raised over $2.0 billion in capital across three investment vehicles. The firm provides capital to technology-enabled businesses.

History
The firm was founded by two former members of the Kohlberg Kravis Roberts Executive Committee Ned Gilhuly and Scott Stuart in 2005.

Investment strategy
The firm provides growth capital and operational support to small and mid-sized companies in the technology, financial services, and business services sectors.

The employees of Sageview Capital are collectively the single largest investor in the fund.

References

Investment management companies of the United States